Walter Rhodes may refer to:

Walter Rhodes (musician), American blues musician
Walter Eustace Rhodes (1872–1918), English librarian, author and translator
Walter Rhodes (murderer)
Walter Rhodes (Island in the Sky), character in the 1938 film Island in the Sky